Epeli Loaniceva (born 19 October 1992) is a Fijian footballer who plays as a goalkeeper for Fijian club Rewa and the Fiji national team.

Club career
Loaniceva started his career with Labasa. In 2016, he moved to Rewa.

National team
In 2017, Loaniceva was called up by coach Christophe Gamel for the Fiji national football team. He made his debut on November 19, 2017, in a 2–0 loss against Estonia.

References

Fijian footballers
Association football goalkeepers
Labasa F.C. players
Rewa F.C. players
Fiji international footballers
Living people
1992 births